Ramaiah or Ramayya is an Indian name. Notable people with the name include:

 Chukka Ramaiah (born 1925), Indian educationist
 Relangi Venkata Ramaiah (1910–1975), Indian actor, comedian, and producer
 M. S. Ramaiah (1922–1997), Indian educationist, philanthropist, and industrialist
 V. Ramaiah, Indian politician
 Kailasa Venkata Ramiah,  an educationist from India
 Ramayya Krishnan, an Indian American Management and Information technology scholar from Pittsburgh, Pennsylvania. 

Indian surnames